The BHP Mitsubishi Alliance (BMA) is an Australian coal mining company operating in Central Queensland. The largest coal producer in Australia, it is a joint venture with BHP and Mitsubishi each owning 50%. It was established in 2001.

The BMA alliance operates seven mines in the Bowen Basin:
Blackwater
Broadmeadow
Caval Ridge
Daunia
Goonyella Riverside
Peak Downs
Saraji

BMA also operates Moranbah Airport and part of the Hay Point Coal Terminal. It operated the Gregory coal mine until March 2019, when it was sold to Japan's Sojitz Corporation.

References

BHP
Companies based in Brisbane
Mining companies of Australia
Mitsubishi
Non-renewable resource companies established in 2001
2001 establishments in Australia